Brian Rolle (born November 20, 1988) is a former American football linebacker. He was drafted by the Philadelphia Eagles in the sixth round of the 2011 NFL Draft. He played college football at Ohio State. Rolle was a two-year starter at middle linebacker for Ohio State and led the Buckeyes with 76 tackles as a senior.

Professional career
Rolle was projected to be drafted in the fifth round of the 2011 NFL Draft.

Philadelphia Eagles
Rolle was selected by the Philadelphia Eagles in the sixth round (193rd overall) of the 2011 NFL Draft. He signed a four-year contract with the team on July 27, 2011. He became the Eagles starting weak-side linebacker before week 4 and then started all of Philadelphia's remaining 13 games. He scored his first career touchdown in week 9, after he stripped Chicago Bears' RB Matt Forte and picked up the ball and scored. He also recorded a sack against Miami in week 13. He was released by the Eagles October 2, 2012 for poor special teams play.

Pittsburgh Steelers
Rolle was signed to a futures/reserve contract on January 9, 2013 by the Pittsburgh Steelers. He was released by the Steelers on August 31, 2013

Toronto Argonauts
On May 14, 2015, Rolle signed with the Toronto Argonauts of the Canadian Football League. On February 4, 2016, Rolle retired from Canadian Football.

Personal
Rolle is a distant cousin of former Arizona Cardinals defensive back Antrel Rolle, former Tennessee Titans defensive back Samari Rolle, and former Tennessee Titans defensive back Myron Rolle. He is also related to former Cincinnati Bengals wide receiver Chad Johnson. Rolle is a native of Immokalee, Florida.

References

External links

Philadelphia Eagles bio
Ohio State Buckeyes football bio
Toronto Argonauts bio

1988 births
Living people
American people of Bahamian descent
People from Immokalee, Florida
Players of American football from Florida
American football linebackers
Canadian football linebackers
American players of Canadian football
Ohio State Buckeyes football players
Philadelphia Eagles players
Pittsburgh Steelers players
Toronto Argonauts players